Latrunculiidae is a family of sponges belonging to the order Poecilosclerida.

Genera:
 Bomba Kelly, Reiswig & Samaai, 2016
 Cyclacanthia Samaai & Kelly, 2004
 Latrunclava Kelly, Reiswig & Samaai, 2016
 Latrunculia du Bocage, 1869
 Sceptrella Schmidt, 1870
 Strongylodesma Lévi, 1969
 Tsitsikamma Samaai & Kelly, 2002

References

Poecilosclerida
Sponge families